Athanasiou Diakou Street (Odos Athanasiou Diakou), named after the Greek War of Independence hero Athanasios Diakos, is a short but wide central street in Athens linking Vasilissis Amalias Avenue and Andrea Syngrou Avenue, it is a small branch linking with Vouliagmenis Avenue where it ends along with Kallirois and Arditou Streets which links with Vasileos Konstantinou Avenue.  It also contains a small intersection with Iosif Rogou Street which is used for local traffic.  Its total length is only nearly 200 m.

Residential buildings lie on the southwest side and forests lie to the northeast side.

Streets in Athens